Oban is a town in Argyll, Scotland. It may also refer to:

Places
 Oban, New South Wales, a rural location within Armidale Regional Council area, Australia
Oban River, in New South Wales, Australia
Oban, New Zealand, a settlement on Stewart Island
Oban, Outer Hebrides, a community on Harris, Scotland
Oban, Saskatchewan, an unincorporated area in Canada
Oban Hills, a range of hills in Nigeria
Oban railway station, in Argyll, Scotland

People
Eduardo Oban (born 1955), Filipino air force general
Erin Oban, American politician and teacher

Other uses
Oban and District, a Scottish bus-company, now part of West Coast Motors
Oban Camanachd, a shinty team from Oban
Oban Celtic, a shinty team from Oban
Oban Distillery, which produces Oban Scotch whisky

See also
Oben (disambiguation)